is a Japanese chemist and Nobel Prize Laureate (2010), who first published the Suzuki reaction, the organic reaction of an aryl- or vinyl-boronic acid with an aryl- or vinyl-halide catalyzed by a palladium(0) complex, in 1979.

Early life and education
Suzuki was born on September 12, 1930, in Mukawa, Hokkaidō, his father died when he was in high school. He studied chemistry at Hokkaido University (Hokudai) and after receiving his PhD while he worked there as assistant professor. He initially wanted to major in mathematics, his favorite subject in childhood was arithmetic. It was an encounter with two books that became an opportunity to advance to the path of organic synthesis, one is Textbook of Organic Chemistry written by Louis Fieser of Harvard University, and another is Hydroboration written by Herbert C. Brown of Purdue University.

Career
From 1963 until 1965, Suzuki worked as a postdoctoral student with Herbert C. Brown at Purdue University and after returning to the Hokudai he became a full professor there. The postdoctoral experience was utilized in the study of the coupling reaction with his assistant Norio Miyaura and led to the discovery of Suzuki reaction announced in 1979. Its organic boronic acids with aryl and vinyl group are stable to water and air, easy to handle, and because the conditions required for use are also relatively mild, even among the several cross-coupling techniques, it is said to be easy to use. Its full mechanism is shown in the image below.

With his retirement from Hokudai in 1994 he took several positions in other universities: 1994–1995 Okayama University of Science and 1995–2002 Kurashiki University of Science and the Arts. In addition, he was an invited professor at Purdue University (2001), Academic Sinica and the National Taiwan University (2002).

In 2010, Suzuki was jointly awarded the Nobel Prize for Chemistry together with Richard F. Heck and Ei-ichi Negishi.

To celebrate International Year of Chemistry (IYC 2011), Suzuki was interviewed by the UNESCO Courier magazine, he said：
Today some people see chemistry just as a polluting industry, but that is a mistake ... Without it, productivity would drop and we could not enjoy the life we know today. If there is pollution, it is because we are releasing harmful substances. Obviously, we have to adapt treatment and management regimes and work to develop chemical substances and manufacturing processes that respect the environment.

In 2014, a Canadian-Chinese student asked for Suzuki's advice: "how can I become a great chemist like you?", Suzuki answered him: "... above all else, you must learn to see through the appearance to perceive the essence."

Invention without patent
Suzuki has not obtained a patent on Suzuki reaction technology because he thinks that the research was supported by government funds, therefore coupling technology has become widespread, and many products using this technology have been put into practical use. To date, there are more than 6,000 papers and patents related to Suzuki reaction.

Recognition

1986 – Weissberger-Williams lectureship Award
1987 – Korean Chemical Society Award
1989 – Chemical Society of Japan Award
1995 – DowElanco lectureship Award
2000 – The H. C. Brown Lecture Award
2003 – Japan Academy Prize 
2009 – Paul Karrer Gold Medal
2009 – Special Member of Royal Society of Chemistry (RSC)
2010 – Nobel Prize in Chemistry
2010 – Order of Culture
2010 – Person of Cultural Merit
2011 – Member of the Japan Academy
2011 – honored on a stamp issued by Republic of the Congo
2016 – Honorary chair professorship, National Cheng Kung University

See also

 List of Japanese Nobel laureates

References

External links
Akira Suzuki "Letter to a young chemist" in The UNESCO Courier, "CHEMISTRY AND LIFE",  January–March 2011
 
 The Nobel Prize in Chemistry 2010 Richard F. Heck, Ei-ichi Negishi, Akira Suzuki press release
 Akira Suzuki

Japanese chemists
Japanese Nobel laureates
1930 births
Living people
People from Hokkaido
Organic chemists
Nobel laureates in Chemistry
Recipients of the Order of Culture
Hokkaido University alumni
Academic staff of Hokkaido University
20th-century chemists
21st-century chemists